Howard Anthony Gayle (born 18 May 1958) is an English former footballer who played for Birmingham City, Blackburn Rovers, Fulham, Halifax Town, Liverpool, Newcastle United, Sunderland and Stoke City.

Gayle began his career with Liverpool, becoming the first black player to play for the team. After loan spells with Fulham and Newcastle United he joined Birmingham City in search of regular first team football. He then played for Sunderland and had a short spell in the United States playing indoor football with the Dallas Sidekicks. He returned to England and played for Stoke City, Blackburn Rovers and ended his career with Halifax Town.

Club career
Gayle was born in Toxteth and joined the youth ranks at local side Liverpool in 1974. He signed a professional contract with the club in 1977, becoming the first black player to play for Liverpool, which was seen as a "victory" for the black community in Liverpool.

His finest hour for Liverpool came in the 1980–81 European Cup semi-final second leg away at Bayern Munich when he came on as an early substitute to help Liverpool draw 1-1 and progress to the final on the away goals rule. Although he was a non-playing substitute in the final, he was rewarded with a winner's medal. After loan spells at Fulham and Newcastle United he left Anfield after making just five appearances.

Gayle joined Birmingham City where he played in the 1982–83 season scoring once against West Ham and then he hit 10 in 45 during the 1983–84 campaign. Gayle then signed for Len Ashurst's Sunderland, where he became a popular player playing in two seasons before moving to the United States to play for Dallas Sidekicks in the Major Indoor Soccer League. He returned to England in April 1987 to play for Stoke City, playing six matches at the end of the 1986–87 season, scoring twice in a 3–2 defeat against Bradford City.

He then spent five years at Blackburn Rovers, signing for them in 1987 and being a regular striker in their quest for top flight football. However, by the time Blackburn were promoted to the newly-created Premier League in 1992, Gayle had fallen down the pecking order in favour of expensive new signings Mike Newell and David Speedie, and with the arrival of national record signing Alan Shearer that summer, it was clear that Blackburn manager Kenny Dalglish felt that Gayle was surplus to requirements at Ewood Park.

Gayle joined Halifax Town in the newly renamed Division Three but managed just five league appearances as they were relegated to the Football Conference. After leaving Halifax he had a brief trial at Carlisle United, before retiring from football.

International career
As an overage player, he helped England win the 1984 UEFA European Under-21 Football Championship, in which he scored a goal in the final against Spain.

Personal life
Gayle was born to a father from Sierra Leone and a mother from Ghana. In August 2016, it was reported that Gayle had turned down a nomination for an MBE for his work with "Show Racism the Red Card", saying it would be "a betrayal to all of the Africans who have lost their lives, or who have suffered as a result of Empire."

He released his autobiography in October 2016 titled 61 Minutes in Munich.

Career statistics
Source:

A.  The "Other" column constitutes appearances and goals in the European Cup, Full Members Cup, Football League play-offs, Football League Trophy.

Honours
 Liverpool
 European Cup winner: 1980–81

 Sunderland
 Football League Cup runner-up: 1984–85

 England under-21
1984 UEFA European Under-21 Football Championship

References

External links
 
 Thisisanfield.com Forgotten Heroes
 Profile at LFCHistory.net
 Interview with Gayle on Talksport

1958 births
Living people
People from Toxteth
Liverpool F.C. players
Footballers from Liverpool
Fulham F.C. players
Newcastle United F.C. players
Birmingham City F.C. players
Sunderland A.F.C. players
Stoke City F.C. players
Blackburn Rovers F.C. players
Halifax Town A.F.C. players
Dallas Sidekicks (original MISL) players
English footballers
England under-21 international footballers
Association football forwards
English Football League players
Black British sportsmen
English autobiographers